Dean Woodbridge may refer to:
Samuel Merrill Woodbridge (1819–1905), dean of Rutgers University
George Woodbridge (1930–2004), known as "America's Dean of Uniform Illustration"
Dudley W. Woodbridge, dean of The College of William & Mary Law School
Frederick James Eugene Woodbridge (1867–1940), dean of Columbia University